In geometry, the truncated order-4 apeirogonal tiling is a uniform tiling of the hyperbolic plane. It has Schläfli symbol of t{∞,4}.

Uniform colorings 
A half symmetry coloring is tr{∞,∞},  has two types of apeirogons, shown red and yellow here. If the apeirogonal curvature is too large, it doesn't converge to a single ideal point, like the right image, red apeirogons below. Coxeter diagram are shown with dotted lines for these divergent, ultraparallel mirrors.

Symmetry
From [∞,∞] symmetry, there are 15 small index subgroup by mirror removal and alternation. Mirrors can be removed if its branch orders are all even, and cuts neighboring branch orders in half. Removing two mirrors leaves a half-order gyration point where the removed mirrors met. In these images fundamental domains are alternately colored black and white, and mirrors exist on the boundaries between colors. The symmetry can be doubled as ∞42 symmetry by adding a mirror bisecting the fundamental domain. The subgroup index-8 group, [1+,∞,1+,∞,1+] (∞∞∞∞) is the commutator subgroup of [∞,∞].

Related polyhedra and tiling

See also

Uniform tilings in hyperbolic plane
List of regular polytopes

References
 John H. Conway, Heidi Burgiel, Chaim Goodman-Strass, The Symmetries of Things 2008,  (Chapter 19, The Hyperbolic Archimedean Tessellations)

External links 

 Hyperbolic and Spherical Tiling Gallery

Apeirogonal tilings
Hyperbolic tilings
Isogonal tilings
Order-4 tilings
Truncated tilings
Uniform tilings